In terrestrial vertebrates, digitigrade locomotion is walking or running on the toes (from the Latin digitus, 'finger', and gradior, 'walk'). A digitigrade animal is one that stands or walks with its toes (metatarsals) on the ground, and the rest of its foot lifted. Digitigrades include birds (what many see as bird's knees are actually ankles), cats, dogs, and many other mammals, but not plantigrades (such as humans) or unguligrades (such as horses). Digitigrades generally move more quickly and quietly than other animals.

There are anatomical differences between the limb anatomy of plantigrades, unguligrades, and digitigrades. Digitigrade and unguligrade animals have relatively long carpals and tarsals, and the bones which correspond to the human ankle are thus set much higher in the limb than in a human. In a digitigrade animal, this effectively lengthens the foot, so much so that what are often thought of as a digitigrade animal's "hands" and "feet" correspond to only the human fingers or toes.  Digitigrade locomotion is responsible for the distinctive hooked shape of dog legs.

Plantigrade animals, such as humans, normally walk with the soles of their feet on the ground.  Unguligrade animals, such as horses and cattle, walk only on the distal-most tips of their digits.  Digitigrade animals walk on their distal and intermediate phalanges; more than one segment of the digit makes contact with the ground, either directly (as in birds) or via paw-pads (as in dogs and cats).

Examples

 Mesonychids
 Dinosaurs (digitigrade and semi-digitigrade)
 Birds (except for loons and grebes which are plantigrade)
 Pigs (semi-digitigrade)
 Hippos (semi-digitigrade)
 Pakicetus
 Indohyus
 Thylacine 
 Cats
 Hyenas
 Mongooses
 Canids
 Elephants (semi-digitigrade)
 Capybaras (semi-digitigrade)
 Trucidocynodon (semi-digitigrade at least in the forelimbs)

References

External links 
 Yes, the Shin Bone Is Connected to the Ankle Bone

Terrestrial locomotion